Vadodara (formerly Baroda Lok Sabha constituency) is one of the 26 Lok Sabha (lower house of Indian parliament) constituencies in Gujarat, a state in Western India. This constituency covers 7 out of 10 Vidhan Sabha constituencies of Vadodara district and first held elections in 1957 as Baroda Lok Sabha constituency in erstwhile Bombay State (present day Gujarat). It has been known as Vadodara since the 2009 elections. Its first member of parliament (MP) was Fatehsinghrao Gaekwad of the Indian National Congress (INC) who was also re-elected in the next elections in 1962. He was the Maharaja of Baroda of the Gaekwad dynasty at the time. P. C. Patel of the Swatantra Party won the election in 1967. From 1971–80, Gaekwad was MP of this constituency again firstly as a member of the Indian National Congress (Organisation) and then as a member of the INC. His younger brother, Ranjitsinh Pratapsinh Gaekwad also of the INC represented the constituency from 1980–89 for two terms before being defeated by Prakash Brahmbhatt of the Janata Dal party in the 1989 election.

In 1991, television actress Deepika Chikhalia of the Bharatiya Janata Party (BJP) won the seat. She was best known at the time for playing Sita, Hindu god Rama's wife in the highly popular television adaptation of the Hindu religious epic, Ramayan. Satyasinh Dilipsinh Gaekwad of the INC won the election in 1996. In all, three members of the Gaekwad royal family have represented this seat as an MP. The constituency has been represented by a member of the BJP since 1998: Jayaben Thakkar served for three terms from 1998 to 2009 and Balkrishna Khanderao Shukla served one term from 2009 to 2014. The current prime minister, Narendra Modi won the seat in the 2014 elections by a victory margin of 570,128 votes, which is one of the highest margins in history of Lok Sabha polls. However he chose to vacate the seat on 29 May to comply with election rules barring an MP from representing two constituencies and instead retained his seat in Varanasi in Uttar Pradesh. In the subsequent by election, Ranjanben Dhananjay Bhatt of the BJP was elected and currently represents the constituency as its MP.

Assembly Segment

Members of Parliament

 *By Election

Election results

General election 1957

General election 1962

General election 1967

General election 1971

General election 1977

General election 1980

General election 1984

General election 1989

General election 1991

General election 1996

General election 1998

General election 1999

General election 2004

General election 2009

General election 2014

By election 2014

General election 2019

See also
 Vadodara district
 List of Constituencies of the Lok Sabha

Notes

References

Lok Sabha constituencies in Gujarat
Government of Vadodara